Second Chances is a 1998 film directed by James Fargo. It stars Tom Amandes, former A Little Princess star Kelsey Mulrooney, Isabel Glasser, and The Nanny's Charles Shaughnessy and Madeline Zima. Second Chances is based on a true story.

Plot
After a car accident kills her father and damages her leg, a 10-year-old girl named Sunny Matthews moves with her overprotective mother Kathleen Matthews to a trailer park. Next door is a horse ranch run by former rodeo star Ben Taylor. While adjusting to her new life, Sunny develops a fondness for Ben and Ginger, a beautiful barrel racing American Quarter Horse. Kathleen doesn't approve of Ben and Ginger, but she eventually trusts them. Sunny finds happiness in ginger and gets motivation to heal their injuries to be able to race.

Cast
Kelsey Mulrooney as Sunny Matthews
Tom Amandes as Benjamin "Ben" Taylor
Isabel Glasser as Kathleen Matthews
Terry Moore as Dallas Taylor Judd 
Stuart Whitman as William "Buddy"
Charles Shaughnessy as Dr. Hugh Olson
Madeline Zima as Melinda Judd
Theodore Bikel as Dutch John Hathaway
Charles Napier as Craig Hardy
Allan Miller as Dr. Rasmussen

References

External links

1989 films
Films directed by James Fargo
Films about horses
1990s English-language films
1980s English-language films